Aboud El Khodary (born 27 November 1947) is an Egyptian former footballer who played most of his career for Al-Masry.

External links

1947 births
Living people
People from Port Said
Egyptian footballers
Association football forwards
Al Masry SC players
Expatriate footballers in Greece
Kallithea F.C. players
Egyptian football managers
Expatriate football managers in Saudi Arabia
Al-Shoulla FC managers
Ohod Club managers
Saudi First Division League managers
Sportspeople from Port Said
20th-century Egyptian people